is a former professional Japanese baseball player. As a boy, Ichiro Suzuki learned to pattern his original swinging pendulum leg kick after Shinozuka's.

External links

1957 births
Living people
People from Chōshi
Baseball people from Chiba Prefecture
Japanese baseball players
Nippon Professional Baseball infielders
Yomiuri Giants players
Japanese baseball coaches
Nippon Professional Baseball coaches